The Gadhai are a Muslim community found in the state of Gujarat in India.

Origin 
The Gadhai claim to have immigrated from Rajasthan about five hundred years ago. They were first settled in Kutch, where they were employed by the local Rajputs, and then brought to Saurashtra by the Kathi rulers. The Gadhai bred donkeys, which were the main beasts of burdens. They are said to get their name from the Gujarati word for a donkey, which is gadha, and gadhai means a donkey keeper. The Gadhai were also involved in selling salt. According to their traditions, the community were once Rajputs, who lost status as a result of their conversion to Islam. They are now found mainly in the districts of Amreli, Bhavnagar and Junagadh.  The Gadhai speak Gujarati, but some also understand Urdu.

Present circumstances 
The community is divided into thirteen clans, all of whom intermarry. Their main clans are  Savat,Kaliya, Lalliya, Rathore (Rathod), Musia, Gagaina, Ming, Saag, Zorana, Sayara, Mamodia, Lallagh and Naar.

The Gadhai have seen a decline in their traditional occupation, which was selling salt. Many are now small and medium-sized farmers. A smaller number are sharecroppers, with a few employed as agricultural labourers. The Gadhai are Sunni Muslims, and have customs similar to other Gujarati Muslim communities.and the most powerful people of gadhai .ajaz savat

References

Social groups of Gujarat
Muslim communities of Gujarat
Muslim communities of India